The Seacoast United Phantoms (formerly the New Hampshire Phantoms) are an American soccer team based in the coastal region of southeastern New Hampshire and northeastern Massachusetts. The team is based in Portsmouth, New Hampshire, where it played from 2011 to 2017, in the stadium of Portsmouth High School. Founded in 1996, the team plays in USL League Two, the fourth tier of the American Soccer Pyramid. The team's colors are blue, white, gold and black.

The team also fields a team in the USL's Super-20 League, a league for players 17 to 20 years of age run under the United Soccer Leagues umbrella.

History

USISL Pro League/USISL D-3 Pro League
New Hampshire Phantoms joined the ranks of American pro soccer in 1996 as an expansion franchise in the third-tier USISL Pro League. They finished their first season in competition with a decent 8–7–1 record, in 6th place in the Northeast Conference behind Central Jersey Riptide, but out of the playoffs. They improved to a 9–5–4 record in 1997 and finished third in the Northeast behind North Jersey Imperials, and qualified for the post-season for the first time. Their run through the playoffs was impressive: they took out divisional rivals Rhode Island Stingrays 2–1 in overtime in the divisional semi finals, and then beat Central Jersey Riptide 2–0 to progress to the national tournament. The Phantoms squeaked past Mid-Atlantic division side Baltimore Bays 1–0 in overtime in the quarter finals, and were just one win away from the Championship Game, but lost 2–1 in overtime to eventual champions Albuquerque Geckos in the semi finals. Ron Murphy was the Phantoms' top scorer in a very successful year, with 19 goals, the fourth best in the league.

Things were even better for the Phantoms in 1998, as they improved their regular season performance for the second straight year, finishing with a 10–6–2 records and 2nd in the Northeast behind Rhode Island Stingrays. Their '98 playoff run was even more impressive than the previous year's: they beat Western Mass Pioneers 2–1 in overtime in the divisional semi final, and qualified for the national tournament for the second time with a dogged 3–2 win over Rhode Island in the divisional final. The Phantoms downed Central Jersey Riptide 3–0 in the quarter finals, and then overcame South Central Division champions Austin Lone Stars 2–1 in overtime in the semis. New Hampshire faced the Chicago Stingers in the Championship Game, but fell 3–2 in another overtime classic, and eventually finished the year as the second-best team in the D3 Pro League. In the post-season awards, goalkeeper Jeremy Bailey was honored as one of the top stoppers in the league, with an impressive 1.09 GAA average.

USL D-3 Pro League
1999 cemented New Hampshire's position as perennial contenders: they finished third in the re-structured Northern Division behind Western Mass Pioneers with a 13–5–0 record, and beat New Jersey Stallions 1–0 in the conference playoff semi-finals, but failed to progress to the national competition for a third straight year as they were beaten 1–0 in overtime by Western Mass in the Conference Final. Ron Murphy was again the Phantoms' top scorer, with 15 goals, while Andrew Boyea posted encouraging 1.27 GAA goalkeeping stats.

The Phantoms made the post season for a fourth time in 2000, finishing third behind the New Jersey Stallions in the regular season table, but fell at the first hurdle in the playoffs, losing 3–2 to Reading Rage first time out. 2001 was much of the same: second in the regular season behind the expansion Boston Bulldogs with an 8–8–2 record, but out in the first round of the playoffs following a 4–2 loss to their divisional rivals, the New Jersey Stallions, although Ron Murphy continued to be a potent goal scoring force for the Phantoms, with 17 goals on the season. 2002 was the first year that things did not go the Phantoms' way, as they finished the year bottom of the Northern Conference table with just four wins all season, and out of the playoffs for the first time in four years.

USL Pro Select League
The D3 Pro League became the Pro Select League in 2003, and the Phantoms bounced back superbly in regular season play, finishing second in the Northern Region behind Westchester Flames with a hugely encouraging 11–7–2 record, before falling to the Flames 5–3 on aggregate in the first round of the playoffs. 2003 also saw New Hampshire's first foray into the US Open Cup, but their stay in the competition was marked by controversy: they originally beat USASA team Bridgeport Italians 3–0 in the second round; however, the team the Italians beat in the first round – PDL outfit Chesapeake Dragons – protested the result of the first-round game, due to the Italians fielding an ineligible player, and as a result the Italians were disqualified from the competition. This meant that New Hampshire had to play a *second* second-round game, this time against Chesapeake. Fortunately, the Phantoms won the game 3–2 with a golden goal from Ebbie Kodiat, and progressed to the third round – where they were unceremoniously dumped out of the competition 4–1 by A-League side Rochester Raging Rhinos. Bjørn Hansen was New Hampshire's top scorer, with 17 goals, the fourth best figures in the league.

2004 brought the first piece of silverware to New Hampshire when, after eight years of competition, they topped the Northern Division standings, four points clear of second placed Westchester Flames. The Phantoms got a bye to the Pro Soccer League playoff semi finals, and were well-placed to make their second trip to the Championship game, but were unexpectedly beaten 1–0 by Southern Division winners Charlotte Eagles, and went home early. The Phantoms also made their second trip to the US Open Cup in '04, but unexpectedly lost 5–1 to PDL team Chicago Fire Reserves in the second round. Bjørn Hansen was again New Hampshire's top scorer, with 16 goals on the season, while Kyle Singer posted 1.223 GAA goalkeeping stats.

USL Second Division
The USL Pro Select League was renamed the USL Second Division in 2005, and converted to a single-table format, but the Phantoms never got to grips with the new setup, and struggled on the field. The Phantoms lost five of their six opening games, conceding three goals in four of the games, and were grasping for any kind of run in form almost from the beginning of the season. A 6–0 hammering of the Northern Virginia Royals at home in early June that featured a brace from striker Mark Manganello briefly raised the spirits, and back-to-back wins over Long Island Rough Riders and Charlotte Eagles hinted that a late-season surge could be on the cards in Manchester, but the Phantoms reverted to their poor form quickly. A win and three ties in July effectively ended their playoff hopes, and the 5–2 defeat on the road at Long Island was the low point of the year. A final day victory over the Rough Riders made up for their pummeling earlier in the season, but it was too little too late for New Hampshire, who ended the season in 7th place, 22 points behind regular season champions Western Mass Pioneers. Bjørn Hansen and Thomas McNeil shared the goal scoring spoils, with 6 goals each, while Ricky Charles, Hansen and James Proctor weighed in with 3 assists apiece.

2006 was a year of mid-table obscurity for the Phantoms, finishing with a 9–10–1 record, and in 5th place in the USL Second Division standings, just missing out on the post season once more. The year started brightly for New Hampshire, with two wins and a tie in their first three games, including 3–1 victory over Long Island Rough Riders. The Phantoms were quite excellent at home, losing just two games in front of their own fans all season. Defender Narciso Fernandes scored twice in their 3–1 win over Western Mass Pioneers in mid-July, and Almir Barbosa hit a hat trick against the Cincinnati Kings in their 3–1 win in early August. The Phantoms even enjoyed a brief run to the third round of the US Open Cup, taking out Connecticut-based USASA side Milford International before being walloped 5–1 by USL First Division outfit Rochester Raging Rhinos. Unfortunately, the Phantoms' form on the road was abysmal, with eight straight road losses away from home stretching from early June through to the edge of the season. They also suffered some humiliating defeats during this stretch: Western Mass Pioneers hit them for six in mid-July, and put another half dozen past them in a 6–2 win in August. The Harrisburg City Islanders hit four in a bad-tempered game which saw three men sent off in injury time, and the Richmond Kickers showed no mercy to goalkeeper T.J. Tomasso when completing an 8–0 rout on the final day of the season. Almir Barbosa was the Phantoms' top scorer, with 10 goals, while Thomas McNeil contributed 5 assists.

The Phantoms sank to their lowest ebb in 2007, winning just three games in what turned out to be a long and difficult season. They started the season with a 7-game winless streak, being hammered 4–0 by both the Richmond Kickers and the Cincinnati Kings, and conceding an injury time goal to Cleveland City Stars in their 3–2 defeat there, before eventually winning their first game of the season, 1–0 over Western Mass Pioneers in early June. Due to stadium issues, the Phantoms were forced to play 10 of their first 14 games on the road, prior to embarking on a 6-game home stand to finish the season. The Phantoms did manage to pick up two more wins – 2–1 over Richmond Kickers and a hard-fought 3–2 over Wilmington Hammerheads – but were eliminated from playoff contention well before their 3–1 loss to Cincinnati on the final day of the season. They eventually finished the year 9th of 10 in the standings, just one point ahead of rock-bottom Bermuda Hogges, to whom they lost twice. Almir Barbosa was New Hampshire's top scorer for the second year in a row, with 6 goals, while Thomas McNeil contributed 2 assists.

In an attempt to consolidate their finances and restructure their organization, the Phantoms took voluntary relegation from the USL Second Division to the Premier Development League at the end of 2007.

USL Premier Development League
The club's transition into the PDL began with an inconsistent run of performances, however after winning their division and reaching the regional finals in 2014 the Phantoms have now established themselves as a force within the North East Division. In 2016 they appointed Alistair Bain as their new head coach, who arrives from GPS Portland Phoenix having had a very successful 7-year tenure in charge. In 2017 they won the regular season of their division.

USL League Two 
In 2019, the club moved to the newly created USL League Two, the fourth division of American soccer. In their inaugural season, they finished 6th in the Northeast division, and missed out on the playoffs.

Players

Current roster

Notable former players

This list of notable former players comprises players who went on to play professional soccer after playing for the team in the Premier Development League, or those who previously played professionally before joining the team.

Year-by-year

Honors
 USL Pro Select League Northern Division Champions: 2004
 USL PDL Northeast Division Champions: 2014, 2017
 USL League Two Northeast Division Champions: 2022

Head coaches
  Sean Carey (2006–2009)
  Stefano Franciosa (2010)
  Alistair Bain (2016–2018)
  Alex Ryan (2020–current)

Stadia
 Singer Family Park; Manchester, New Hampshire (2003)
 Stadium at Souhegan High School; Amherst, New Hampshire, 3 games (2003, 2005–2006)
 Owl Stadium; Keene, New Hampshire, 3 games (2003, 2006)
 Stadium at Manchester West High School; Manchester, New Hampshire (2004)
 Stadium at Southern New Hampshire University; Manchester, New Hampshire (2005, 2009–2010)
 Veterans Memorial Stadium; Lawrence, Massachusetts (2006)
 Clement Lemire Stadium; Manchester, New Hampshire (2007–2008)
 Stadium at Portsmouth High School; Portsmouth, New Hampshire (2011–2022)
 Stadium at New England Sports Park; Amesbury, New Hampshire (2022-present)

Average attendance

Attendance stats are calculated by averaging each team's self-reported home attendances from the historical match archive at https://web.archive.org/web/20100105175057/http://www.uslsoccer.com/history/index_E.html.

 2008: 2,901
 2009: 434
 2010: 106
 2011: 275
 2012: 198
 2013: 83
 2014: 171

References

External links

USL League Two teams
Soccer clubs in New Hampshire
Phantoms
Association football clubs established in 1996
Sports in Manchester, New Hampshire
USL Second Division teams
1996 establishments in New Hampshire